Edwin Herbert Steventon (16 August 1891 – 1961) was an English footballer who played in the Football League for Stoke.

Career
Steventon was born in Nantwich and played for Walsall, Wednesbury Old Athletic, Southampton, Aston Villa and Nantwich Victoria before joining Stoke in 1920. He played three matches for Stoke at the end of the 1920–21 season in place of Percy Knott. At the end of the season he re-joined Nantwich Victoria and served as back up 'keeper at Wolverhampton Wanderers in 1922.

Career statistics

References

English footballers
Aston Villa F.C. players
Southampton F.C. players
Stoke City F.C. players
Walsall F.C. players
Wednesbury Old Athletic F.C. players
Wolverhampton Wanderers F.C. players
English Football League players
People from Nantwich
1891 births
1961 deaths
Sportspeople from Cheshire
Association football goalkeepers